Andradina Biological Reserve is a biological reserve administered by  São Paulo state, Brazil.

Location

The reserve was created by São Paulo state on 17 December 1985 as a biological reserve under the terms of the Federal Law 4.771 of 15 September 1965. It had formerly been the Estação Experimental de Zootecnia de Andradina.
It is located in the municipality of Andradina.
It covers an area of

Conservation

The reserve is home to endangered titi monkeys.
Threats include encroachment of people, cattle and horses, accidental fires, poaching and siltation and pollution of the water courses.

Notes

Sources

1985 establishments in Brazil
Biological reserves of Brazil
Protected areas of São Paulo (state)
Protected areas established in 1985
Protected areas of the Atlantic Forest